Setext (Structure Enhanced Text) is a lightweight markup language used to format plain text documents such as e-newsletters, Usenet postings, and e-mails.  In contrast to some other markup languages (such as HTML), the markup is easily readable without any parsing or special software.

Setext was first introduced in 1991 by Ian Feldman for use in the TidBITS electronic newsletter.

Purpose 
Setext allows viewing of marked-up documents without special viewing software. When appropriate software is used, however, a rich text-style experience is available to the user.

Smaller documents are trivial to create in any text editor.

To prevent errors, most large setext publications are created using a markup language such as HTML or SGML and then converted. The setext document can then be distributed without the need for the recipient to use a HTML email or web viewer.

Multiple setext documents in the same file 
Multiple setext documents can be stored in the same file, similarly to how the mbox format can store multiple e-mail messages together.

It was initially announced that multiple documents could be included in a single stream, separated by a special <end> tag serving as a document delimiter. After several months, it was clarified that this tag was not an official part of setext, and that multiple documents should instead be delimited by $$ appearing at the end of a line of text.

Regardless of the number of documents stored in the same file, basic metadata can be stored about any or all of them by using the subject-tt tag syntax.

Setext tags 
The following are the ten most common of the 16 different setext tags.

Standalone Setext files 
By default all properly setext-ized files will have an ".etx" or ".ETX" suffix. This stands for an "emailable/enhanced text".

See also 
Other lightweight markup languages (inspired by Setext):
 Markdown, one of the most used.
 reStructuredText, used to generate Python manuals.
 Textile, designed to generate HTML.
 txt2tags

References

Notes

References

External links 
 Setext format
 Setext historical documents at Archive.org
 TidBITS introduction of setext
 setext+sgml at W3.org, including the same document in both setext-like plain text and html formats to allow a side-by-side comparison.

Implementations 
 setext2html.pl — A Perl setext -> HTML converter
 setextbrowser.zomdir.com – A web application which let you browse the internet in a semi-setext format

Lightweight markup languages